Pellston Regional Airport , also known as Pellston Regional Airport of Emmet County, is a public airport located  northwest of the central business district of Pellston, a village in Emmet County, Michigan, United States. It is included in the Federal Aviation Administration (FAA) National Plan of Integrated Airport Systems for 2017–2021, in which it is categorized as a non-hub primary commercial service facility.

Mainly a general aviation airport, Pellston Regional Airport also functions as the primary commercial airport for the sparsely populated northern tip of Michigan's Lower Peninsula, owing to its location halfway between the region's primary cities, Petoskey and Cheboygan, as well as its close proximity to the tourist centers of Mackinaw City and Mackinac Island. One commercial airline, SkyWest (doing business as Delta Connection), currently serves Pellston Regional with three departures and three arrivals daily.

The  northern lodge-themed passenger terminal building was constructed in 2003 and designed by architect Paul W. Powers. The new passenger terminal building replaced a smaller terminal building that was demolished. Wireless internet service is available throughout the terminal at no charge to travelers.

The airport has commercial service on Delta Air Lines with regional jets operated by SkyWest Airlines. SkyWest generated controversy when it announced plans to operate Essential Air Service (EAS) flights to Pellston as tag flights from Detroit continuing on to Escanaba, another EAS community, and then ending in Minneapolis. The airline cited pilot shortages for the need to condense their flights to the two cities. Both communities objected and threatened to call their U.S. Senators, and SkyWest ended the tag services after a month of flying them. However, more plans for tag flights are expected to take effect in December 2022, operating from Detroit to Pellston to Alpena and then back to Detroit.

The airport received $1,000,000 in 2020 as part of the federal CARES act to maintain operations and receive upgrades during the covid-19 pandemic.

Facilities and aircraft

For the 12-month period ending April 30, 2022, the airport has about 12,000 aircraft operations, or about 32 per day. This includes 84% general aviation, 15% commercial, and <1% military. For the same time period, there are 32 aircraft based on the field: 23 single-engine and 5 multi-engine airplanes as well as 4 jet aircraft.

The airport operates an FBO offering fuel, a courtesy shuttle, conference rooms, crew lounges, snooze rooms, and showers.

Airline and destinations

Passenger

Cargo

Statistics

Terminal
The current terminal serves as baggage claim, check-in, ticketing, TSA checkpoint and gates. Owing to the airport being very small in size and the number of flights, only two gates are necessary and both are located in the terminal. Since 2009, travel services and offices have been placed at the end of baggage claim. On a normal day, three or four people operate this airport. One airline representative manages check-in, ticketing and works as the gate agent. One is a TSA Senior Agent. The others are ground crew and baggage services. Delta/SkyWest currently has two aircraft in use; both are 50-seat Canadair Regional Jets 100/200 series (CRJ-200).

Accidents & Incidents
 On April 23, 1970, a McDonnell Douglas DC-9, operated by North Central Airlines, destined for Sault Ste. Marie Airport, was hijacked. One hijacker demanded to be taken to Detroit. The hijacker was taken down; there were no fatalities.
On May 9, 1970, UAW President Walter Reuther, his wife May, architect Oscar Stonorov, Reuther's bodyguard William Wolfman, the pilot and co-pilot were killed when their chartered Lear-Jet crashed in flames at 9:33 p.m. Michigan time. The plane, arriving from Detroit in rain and fog, was on final approach to the Pellston airstrip near the union's recreational and educational facility at Black Lake. The Learjet 23, operated by Executive Jet Aviation and registered as N434EJ, crashed into trees and caught fire short of the runway. An investigation concluded that illusions produced by the lack of visual cues during a circling approach over unlighted terrain at night to a runway not equipped with approach lights or other visual approach aids caused the crash. The aircraft was written off; there were six fatalities.
 On May 13, 1978, a brand new Piper Cheyenne with less than twenty hours had a CFIT two miles from the departure end of Runway 32 after failing to land at Boyne Falls airport. The NTSB investigation concluded the pilot attempted to land below published minimums for the ILS approach. The weather was extremely foggy at the time, with less than  visibility and  ceiling, while the approach called for a  ceiling and  visibility. A contributing factor was the finding that the middle marker for Runway 32 was not functioning at the time, possibly contributing to the disorientation of the pilot and his location relative to the airfield. The aircraft was destroyed; there were three fatalities.
On January 21, 1999, a Beechcraft Baron impacted terrain while on an ILS instrument approach to the airport. The probable cause was found to be the pilot's failure to maintain altitude and terrain clearance on approach and flight into known icing conditions, as a Saab 340 operated by Mesaba Airlines had earlier reported moderate icing below 3,000 feet while on approach to Pellston. Contributing factors include the pilot's intoxication, the icing conditions, known equipment deficiencies in the aircraft, and trees on the impacted hill.
On February 10, 2007, a Piper Cherokee Six crashed northeast of the airport. The aircraft lost engine power and came to rest in a wooded area. All four aboard survived.
 On January 15, 2013, a Cessna 208B Cargomaster, operated by Martinaire and registered as N1120N, crashed shortly after takeoff from Pellston Regional Airport. It came down in a wooded area; there was one fatality.

References

Other sources

 Essential Air Service documents (Docket DOT-OST-2011-0133) from the U.S. Department of Transportation:
 Ninety-Day Notice (July 15, 2011): Mesaba Aviation, Inc., and Pinnacle Airlines, Inc., each a certificated carrier, hereby give notice of intent to discontinue the current service provided at Pellston, MI, effective October 13, 2011. Mesaba and/or Pinnacle provide service to the community, operating on a fee-for-service basis as “Delta Connection” carriers. Delta has notified Mesaba and Pinnacle that Delta can no longer economically continue this service. Delta is in the process of retiring all turboprop and numerous small jet aircraft operated by Mesaba and Pinnacle. All of the Saab 340 aircraft operated by Mesaba for Delta Connection will be retired by year end. Delta has notified Mesaba and Pinnacle that high fuel costs and low passenger demand further necessitate the filing of this notice. We intend to submit a bid to provide continued service under the EAS program at subsidy rates that will enable us to cover the cost of the operation and a reasonable return on investment.
 Order 2012-4-10 (April 6, 2012): selecting Delta Air Lines, Inc., to provide essential air service (EAS) at Chisholm/Hibbing, Minnesota, and Escanaba, Pellston, and Sault Ste. Marie, Michigan, for $2,517,770, $2,833,558, $1,055,361, and $1,676,136, respectively. At Pellston, the service is to consist of 12 nonstop round trips per week to Detroit in the off-peak, and 14 per week in the peak period. At Sault Ste. Marie, the service will be 13 round trips per week year round. At the remaining two communities, service is to consist of 12 nonstop round trips per week year round. All service is to be operated with 50-seat CRJ-200 aircraft.
 Order 2013-10-8 (October 21, 2013): reselecting Delta Air Lines, Inc., to provide Essential Air Service (EAS) at Pellston and Sault Ste. Marie, Michigan; and SkyWest Airlines, at Paducah, Kentucky; Hancock/Houghton, and Muskegon, Michigan; and Eau Claire, Wisconsin. The Order also tentatively reselects American Airlines, at Watertown, New York. Pellston, Michigan: Docket 2011-0133; Effective Period: November 1, 2013, through January 31, 2016; Service: Off peak: Twelve (12) nonstop round trips per week to Detroit (DTW); Peak: Fourteen (14) nonstop round trips per week to Detroit (DTW) with CRJ-200 Aircraft; Annual Subsidy: $1,077,413.

External links
 
 Lakeshore Express Aviation
 

Airports in Michigan
Essential Air Service
Transportation in Emmet County, Michigan
Buildings and structures in Emmet County, Michigan